This is a list of Hindu temples in the Indian state of Goa.

See also
 Agrashala
 Goan temple
 Vahanas used in Goan temples

References
"Hindu Temples and deities" by Rui Pereira Gomes

Konkani
 
Hindu temples
Goa
Religious buildings and structures in Goa
Lists of tourist attractions in Goa